is a railway station on the West Japan Railway Company JR Tōzai Line in Nishiyodogawa-ku, Osaka, Osaka Prefecture, Japan.

Layout
An island platform serves two tracks on the second floor below ground.

History 
Mitejima Station opened on 8 March 1997,coinciding with the opening of the JR Tōzai Line between Kyobashi and Amagasaki.

Station numbering was introduced in March 2018 with Mitejima being assigned station number JR-H47.

Surroundings
Nishiyodogawa Ward Office
Nishiyodogawa Post Office
Nishiyodogawa Police Station
Nishiyodogawa Tax Office
Nishiyodo Hospital
Ezaki Glico
Utajimabashi Junction (Japan National Route 2, Mitashima-suji, Yodogawa-dori)
Mitejima-ekimae Bus Stops (Osaka Municipal Transportation Bureau)
Utajimabashi Bus Stop (Osaka Municipal Transportation Bureau)

Adjacent stations

References 

Railway stations in Osaka Prefecture